Skyrocket is a superhero published by DC Comics. She first appeared in JLA #61 (February 2002), and was created by Kurt Busiek and Tom Grummett.

Character biography
Lt. Celia Forrestal was in the U.S. Navy, serving as a highly qualified Navy Aviator. Her career stalled as a training instructor because of her gender and race. Looking for some perspective while she considered leaving the service, she visited her parents, scientists and owners of Argo Technologies. Her parents, Mr. and Mrs. Forrestal had developed a personal harness that could absorb, convert and redirect energy. The Forrestals conceived the harness as a tool for peace, but it also had great potential as a weapon of mass destruction.

This invention, called an Argo Harness, drew unwanted attention from a mercenary group of terrorists-for-hire called Scorpio. Scorpio was a well-equipped organization always on the look out for advanced technology that could easily be weaponized. They attempted to steal the Argo Harness, but during their attack, an untimely explosion killed the Forrestals.

Celia survived the explosion that killed her parents because she was wearing the Argo Harness, and she later used it to capture some of the Scorpio operatives who had caused their deaths. Acting on a suggestion from Green Lantern Hal Jordan, who identified with her because of her background as a pilot, she decided to continue crimefighting as the superhero Skyrocket.

Celia worked at a fast food joint in her hometown of St. Louis during the day in order to pay for the equipment she need to maintain and repair the Argo Harness. She was working there when Josiah Power found and recruited her.

Power Company
After mulling over some serious reservations on her part, Celia decided to join the Power Company, a corporate hero team, as a business partner. Josiah provided her with a full technical support crew under Charlie Lau to maintain the harness. Lau improves the machinery inside and out, for example, eliminating its weakness to water. Josiah promises her that she could do as much pro bono work as she wanted on the firm's dollar, as it would be good publicity for the fledgling business. Her old nemesis Doctor Cyber was seen watching her as she exited Power Company headquarters after her first group mission. Skyrocket works with the team through the series sixteen-issue run, coming into repeated conflict with an interdimensional army that wishes to conquer earth through corporate takeover and mystical means.

Ralph Jackson
It has recently been revealed that Sgt. Ralph Jackson is the grandfather of Celia Forrestal. Ralph led a battalion of African-American soldiers in a furious attack on Nazi troops while serving in France during World War II. Jackson was awarded the Silver Star and the Purple Heart for his service, but was appalled to find that prejudicial attitudes in the United States had changed little in his absence.

Infinite Crisis
Operating in San Francisco, Skyrocket is one of several heroes who aids in the efforts to prevent a global super-villain jailbreak.

Later years
In Action Comics #842, Skyrocket describes herself as somebody who "used to be with the Power Company". In that issue and in #843, she is part of a makeshift team of superheroes who had escaped the confines of the 'Auctioneer'. His efforts had resulted in the kidnapping of most of Earth's superhumans.

Skyrocket fights side by side with Nightwing, Firestorm, Superman Blue Jay, Livewire, the Veteran and Aquaman. This grouping only results because they had been stuck in the same energy imprisonment field as Superman by the alien forces. For some time, during the groups reconnaissance and intelligence gathering, a technologically created energy field prevented them believing they could use their powers.

Once this field was destroyed, the team damages the Auctioneer's spaceship and, holding his database hostage, blackmails the entity into restoring everything and everyone stolen from Earth.

Due to a mistake on Livewire's part, most of the adventure is broadcast to every single television on Earth. Due to the Auctioneer wishing to profit off the drama of the escape, many alien worlds also see every step of the incident as well.

In Birds of Prey #100, she is shown reading an invitation from Oracle to become one of her operatives, having apparently returned to St. Louis. What she was currently doing is unknown.

Celia apparently declined Oracle's offer, and was most recently shown as still being with the Power Company. During a break-in at S.T.A.R. Labs, the team is defeated by Doctor Impossible and a group of villains using weaponry from New Genesis. In a later conversation, Mon-El mentions that Skyrocket is in the hospital and has gone into shock from her injuries.

Following this, Celia appears as part of an all-female team of superheroines created by Wonder Woman in order to repel a faux alien invasion masterminded by Professor Ivo. After punching out a robotic siren who was using her abilities to mentally incapacitate a group of men, she remarks: "Pretty girls making guys act dumb. It's just like high school all over again".

Equipment

 Celia's armored suit is known as the Argo Harness; it was invented by her parents, the elder Forrestals, for their company Argo Technologies.
 The Argo Harness is an energy-transforming device that can absorb many kinds of energy, including heat, electromagnetism, and radioactivity, and either convert it into other forms of energy or store it for later use.
 Skyrocket normally utilizes this stored energy as bolts of heat, kinetic energy, or directed electromagnetic fields.
 She can use the harness to fly by repelling the planet's own electromagnetic field.
 The Harness can recharge itself from virtually any kind of energy.
 Any attack carried out against Celia with fire, radioactivity, electricity or any other form of excited particle will just make her more powerful.

Other versions
 A villain using the name Skyrocket appeared in the animated TV series-based comic book Super Friends #4. This Skyrocket predates the mainstream comic version and was not only a supervillain but a European-American male.

References

External links
Komiks.dk Mini Guide to the Power Company
DCU Guide entry for Skyrocket

Comics characters introduced in 2002
DC Comics female superheroes
DC Comics superheroes
African-American superheroes
Fictional lieutenants
Fictional female lieutenants
United States-themed superheroes
Fictional characters from Missouri
Characters created by Kurt Busiek
Fictional United States Navy officers
Fictional naval aviators